Marcel Pichon (1921–1954) was a French botanist specialising in  Apocynaceae.

Publications 
 1948. Classification des apocynacées. 1. Carissées et ambelaniées
 1948. Classification des apocynacées : . IX. Rauvolfiées, alstoniées, allamandées et tabernémontanoïdées
 1950. Classification des apocynacées. 25. Échitoïdées et supplément aux pluméroïdées
 1953. Monographie des landolphiées : Classification des apocynacées, XXXV

References 

 Humbert, J-H; Léandri, J-D. 1955. Marcel Pichon, 1921 - 1954. Taxon 4 (1) : 1-2
 Jaussaud, P; ÉR Brygoo. 2004. Du Jardin au Muséum en 516 biographies, Muséum national d'histoire naturelle, Paris, 2004, 630 pp.

External links 

20th-century French botanists
1921 births
1954 deaths